Preston Hanson (January 17, 1921 – February 12, 2008) was an American actor.

Early years
Hanson was born Iowa and moved to California in 1940. He attended Pasadena Junior College.

Military service
During World War II, Hanson few 65 attack missions as a combat pilot in Europe, for which he received the Air Medal and the Distinguished Flying Cross. He later became a major in the Air Force Reserve.

Acting
Hanson appeared in over 30 TV series and movies over 40 years, including Dynasty, Gunsmoke, Dallas, Goodbye, Norma Jean, Action Jackson and The A-Team among others.
His last credit was in the 1994 comedy Cops and Robbersons. His Broadway credits include Much Ado About Nothing (1952), Saint Joan (1951), and Billy Budd (1951).

Later years 
In 1964, Hanson ran for the Democratic nomination for Congress from the 27th District of California. At that time, he was a property manager. In 1966, he sought the Democratic nomination for the 42nd Assembly District of California's Legislature.

Personal life 
Hanson was married to the former Lorraine Johnson. They had four children.

Filmography

References

External links

1921 births
2008 deaths
American male television actors
American male film actors
20th-century American male actors
United States Army Air Forces pilots of World War II